This is a list of San Francisco Bay Area writers, notable writers who have lived in, or written about, the San Francisco Bay Area.



A

Chester Aaron (May 9, 1923 – August 30, 2019) An American Ghost
Scott Adams (June 8, 1957 – ) Dilbert
Kim Addonizio (July 31, 1954 – ) My Dreams Out in the Street
Laura Albert (November 2, 1965 – ) The Heart Is Deceitful Above All Things
David M. Alexander (1945 – ) My Real Name Is Lisa
Isabel Allende (August 2, 1942 – ) The House of the Spirits
Dorothy Allison (April 11, 1949 – ) Bastard out of Carolina
Charlie Jane Anders, Six Months, Three Days
Brent Anderson (June 15, 1955 – ) Astro City series
Robert Mailer Anderson, Boonville, The Adventures of Teddy Ballgame, Windows on the World
Sarah Andrews, An Eye For Gold
Maya Angelou (April 4, 1928 – May 28, 2014) I Know Why the Caged Bird Sings
Tamim Ansary (November 4, 1948 – ) West of Kabul, East of New York

B
 Natalie Baszile, Queen Sugar
Peter S. Beagle (April 20, 1939 – ) The Last Unicorn
John Bear (1938 – ) Bears' Guide to Earning Degrees by Distance Learning
Dodie Bellamy, Pink Steam
Hester A. Benedict (1838-1921), president, Pacific Coast Women's Press Association
Ambrose Bierce (1842-1914?)
Terry Bisson (February 12, 1942 – ) "They're Made Out of Meat"
Vance Bourjaily (September 17, 1922 – August 31, 2010) Brill Among the Ruins
Steven R. Boyett, Elegy Beach
Kate Braverman (February 5, 1949 – October 12, 2019) "Squandering the Blue"
Genea Brice Poet laureate of Vallejo, California
Luther Burbank (March 7, 1849 – April 11, 1926) How Plants are Trained to Work for Man

C
Patrick Califia (1954 – ) Speaking Sex to Power
Ethan Canin (July 19, 1960 – ) For Kings and Planets
Gail Carriger (May 4, 1976 – ) Soulless
Michael Chabon (May 24, 1963 – ) The Amazing Adventures of Kavalier & Clay
Meg Waite Clayton (January 1, 1959 – ) The Last Train to London, The Race for Paris, The Wednesday Sisters
Andy Couturier (June 3, 1964 – ) The Abundance of Less 
Belo Cipriani (June 21, 1980 – ) Blind: A Memoir
Ann Weiser Cornell (1949 – )  The Power of Focusing

D
Avram Davidson (April 23, 1923 – May 8, 1993) The Scarlet Fig
Kyra Davis, Sex, Murder and a Double Latte
Tiffanie DeBartolo (November 27, 1970 – ) How To Kill a Rock Star, Dream for an Insomniac
Alonzo Delano (July 2, 1806 – September 8, 1874) On the Trail to the California Gold Rush
Diane di Prima (August 6, 1934 – October 25, 2020) Loba
N. A. Diaman (November 1, 1936 – November 8, 2020) Castro Street Memories
Philip K. Dick (December 16, 1928 – March 2, 1982) Do Androids Dream of Electric Sheep?
Greg Downs (November 22, 1971 – ) Spit Baths
Howard Dully (November 30, 1948 – ) My Lobotomy
Robert Duncan (January 7, 1919 – February 3, 1988) The Opening of the Field, Bending the Bow

E
Dossie Easton (February 26, 1944 – ) The Ethical Slut
Dave Eggers (March 12, 1970 – ) A Heartbreaking Work of Staggering Genius, You Shall Know Our Velocity
Duane Elgin (1943 – ) Voluntary Simplicity
Stephen Elliott (December 3, 1971 – ) Happy Baby

F
Lawrence Ferlinghetti (March 24, 1919 – February 22, 2021) A Coney Island of the Mind
Timothy Ferris (August 29, 1944 – ) The Whole Shebang: A State-of-the-Universe(s) Report
Karen Joy Fowler (February 7, 1950 – ) The Jane Austen Book Club
Soma Mei Sheng Frazier
Robert Frost (March 26, 1874 – January 29, 1963) "Stopping by Woods on a Snowy Evening"

G
Michelle Gagnon (July 4, 1971 – ) Don't Turn Around
 Cristina Garcia, Dreaming in Cuban; The Aguero Sisters; King of Cuba
Erle Stanley Gardner (July 17, 1889 – March 11, 1970) Perry Mason novels
Eric Garris (December 1953 – )
Allen Ginsberg (June 3, 1926 – April 5, 1997) "Howl"
Robert Gluck (February 2, 1947 –) Jack the Modernist, Margery Kempe
Herbert Gold (March 9, 1924 – ) Birth of a Hero
Lisa Goldstein (November 21, 1953 – ) The Red Magician
Daphne Gottlieb (1968 – ) Final Girl
Judy Grahn (July 28, 1940 – ) A Woman is Talking to Death
Andrew Sean Greer (November 21, 1970 – ) Less
Susan Griffin (January 26, 1943) Woman and Nature: the Roaring Inside Her

H

Katie Hafner (1957 –) A Romance on Three Legs
Dashiell Hammett (1894 – 1961)
Daniel Handler (February 28, 1970 – ) A Series of Unfortunate Events
Jean Hegland (1956 – ) Into the Forest
John L. Hennessy (1953 – ) Computer Organization and Design
Dorothy J. Heydt A Point of Honor
Jack Hirschman (1933 – 2021)
Jane Hirshfield (February 24, 1953 –) The Ink Dark Moon
Adam Hochschild (1942 – ) King Leopold's Ghost
Khaled Hosseini (March 4, 1965 – ) The Kite Runner
Daedalus Howell (July 19, 1972 – ) The Late Projectionist

J
Shirley Jackson (1916 – 1965)

K
Richard Kadrey (1957 – ) From Myst to Riven
Alan Kaufman, Jew Boy
Jack Kerouac (March 12, 1922 – October 21, 1969) On the Road
Laleh Khadivi, The Walking; The Age of Orphans
Derek Kirk Kim (1974 – ) Same Difference and Other Stories
Carla King (1958 – ) American Borders, Stories from Elsewhere
Laurie R. King (September 19, 1952 – ) The Beekeeper's Apprentice
Maxine Hong Kingston (October 27, 1940 – ) The Woman Warrior
Ellen Klages (1954 – ) "Basement Magic"

L

Howard Lachtman (July 8, 1941 — ), American academic, literary critic, editor and author
Anne Lamott (April 10, 1954 – ) Hard Laughter
D.L. Lang Poet laureate of Vallejo, California
Michael Lederer (July 9, 1956 – ) Cadaqués
Ursula K. Le Guin (October 21, 1929 – January 22, 2018) The Dispossessed
Gus Lee (1946 – )
Fritz Reuter Leiber, Jr. (1910 – 1992)
Daniel Levitin (1957 – ) This Is Your Brain On Music, The Organized Mind
Michael Lewis (October 15, 1960 – ) Liar's Poker
Jack London (January 12, 1876 – November 22, 1916) "To Build a Fire"
Ki Longfellow (December 9, 1944 – ) "The Secret Magdalene"

M
Nick Mamatas (February 20, 1972 – ) Move Under Ground
Micheline Aharonian Marcom (1968 – ) Three Apples Fell from Heaven
Anthony Marra, A Constellation of Vital Phenomena
Armistead Maupin (May 13, 1944 – ) Tales of the City
Terry McMillan (October 18, 1951 –) Waiting to Exhale
Cathleen Miller (February 13, 1956 –) Champion of Choice
Joaquin Miller (September 8, 1837 – February 17, 1913) "Columbus"
Christopher Moore (author) (January 1, 1957 – ) Noir
John Muir (1838 – 1914)

N
Annalee Newitz (1969 – ) White Trash: Race and Class in America
Janis Cooke Newman (1955 – ) Mary: Mrs. A. Lincoln
Wendy Newman (1967 – ) 121 First Dates: How to Succeed at Online Dating, Fall in Love, and Live Happily Ever After (Really!)
 Bich (Beth) Minh Nguyen, Stealing Buddha's Dinner; Short Girls; Pioneer Girl
Katia Noyes, Crashing America

O
Carol Anne O'Marie (1933 – 2009)
Tommy Orange (January 19, 1982 –) There There

P
Charlotte Painter (1926 – ) The Fortunes of Laurie Breaux
Stephan Pastis (January 16, 1968  ) Pearls Before Swine
Diana Paxson (February 20, 1943 – ) Mistress of the Jewels
Howard Pease (September 6, 1894 – April 14, 1974) The Tod Moran Mysteries
 Aimee Phan, We Should Never Meet; The Reeducation of Cherry Truong
Michael Pollan (February 6, 1955 – ) The Omnivore's Dilemma
Tim Pratt (December 12, 1976 – ) The Strange Adventures of Rangergirl

Q
Carol Queen (1958 – ) Real Live Nude Girl
Lisa Quinn, $500 Room Makeovers

R
Justin Raimondo (November 18, 1951 – June 27, 2019) Reclaiming the American Right
Ruth Reichl (January 16, 1948 – ) Tender at the Bone
Mark Rein-Hagen, Vampire: The Masquerade
Kathryn Reiss (December 4, 1957 – ) Time Windows
Barbara Jane Reyes (1971 – ) Poeta en San Francisco
Kim Stanley Robinson (March 23, 1952 – ) Red Mars
Rudy Rucker (March 22, 1946 – ) Software

S

William Saroyan (1908 – 1981) 
Kate Schatz (September 19, 1978 – ) Rad American Women A-Z
Ariel Schrag (December 29, 1979 – ) Awkward
Charles M. Schulz (November 26, 1922 – February 12, 2000) Peanuts
Kemble Scott (1962 – ) SoMa
Mary Ann Shaffer (December 13, 1934 – February 16, 2008) The Guernsey Literary and Potato Peel Pie Society
Dave Smeds (1955 – ) The Sorcery Within
Jane Smiley (September 26, 1949 – ) A Thousand Acres
Jeremy Adam Smith, The Daddy Shift
Gary Snyder (1930 – )
Jeremy Snyder Poet laureate of Vallejo, California
Rebecca Solnit (1961 – ) River of Shadows
Starhawk (June 17, 1951 – ) The Spiral Dance
Joseph Staten, Halo: Contact Harvest
Danielle Steel (August 14, 1947 – ) 
Melissa Stein, Rough Honey, Terrible Blooms 
George Sterling (1869 – 1926) 
George R. Stewart (May 31, 1895 – August 22, 1980) Pickett's Charge
Lisa Gluskin Stonestreet (born 1968) The Greenhouse 
Emelie Tracy Y. Swett (1863 – 1892) Californian Illustrated Magazine
Rachel Swirsky (April 14, 1982 – ) "The Lady Who Plucked Red Flowers Beneath the Queen’s Window"
Mattilda Bernstein Sycamore, That's Revolting!

T
Amy Tan (February 19, 1952 – ) The Joy Luck Club
Michelle Tea (1971 – ) Rose of No Man's Land
Daniel Terdiman (May 31, 1974 – ) The Entrepreneur's Guide to Second Life
Walter Tevis (1928 – 1994)
Robert Alfred Theobald (1884 – 1957) The Final Secret of Pearl Harbor
Adrian Tomine, Optic Nerve
Gail Tsukiyama, The Samurai's Garden
Mark Twain (1835 – April 21, 1910) The Adventures of Tom Sawyer

V
Abraham Verghese (1955 – ) My Own Country

W
Ayelet Waldman (December 11, 1964 – ) Love and Other Impossible Pursuits
Alice Walker (February 9, 1944 – ) The Color Purple
Vivian Walsh, Olive, the Other Reindeer
Alice Waters (April 28, 1944 – ) The Art of Simple Food
Jacob Weisman (February 23, 1965 – ) Death and the Elephant
Herman Whitaker (1867 – 1919) The Mystery of the Barranca
Sean Wilsey (1970 – ) Oh the Glory of It All
Yvor Winters (October 17, 1900 – January 25, 1968) "The Testament of a Stone"
Naomi Wolf (1962 – )
Tobias Wolff (June 19, 1945 – ) This Boy's Life
Russ Woody, The Wheel of Nuldoid

Y
Laurence Yep (1948 – )

Z
Daisy Zamora (June 20, 1950 – ) En limpio se escribe la vida
Helen Zia (1952 – )

See also

 List of people associated with San Francisco
 Litquake

References

San Francisco Bay Area
 

San Francisco Bay Area literature
San Francisco Bay Area-related lists